Ana Ivanovic was the defending champion, but lost in the second round to Michelle Larcher de Brito.

Angelique Kerber won the title, defeating Karolína Plíšková in the final, 6–7(5–7), 6–3, 7–6(7–4).

Seeds
The top eight seeds received a bye into the second round.

Draw

Finals

Top half

Section 1

Section 2

Bottom half

Section 3

Section 4

Qualifying

Seeds

Qualifiers

Lucky loser

Draw

First qualifier

Second qualifier

Third qualifier

Fourth qualifier

Fifth qualifier

Sixth qualifier

Seventh qualifier

Eighth qualifier

References
 Main Draw
 Qualifying Draw

2015 WTA Tour
2015 Singles